Riemke may refer to:

Riemke (Bochum), district of Bochum, North Rhine-Westphalia, Germany
Alwin Riemke (1910–2009), German soccer goalkeeper